Grassy Lick Run is a  tributary stream of the North River, itself a tributary of the Cacapon River, making it a part of the Potomac River and Chesapeake Bay watersheds. Grassy Lick Run flows south through the community of Kirby.

See also
List of West Virginia rivers

References

Rivers of Hampshire County, West Virginia
Rivers of Hardy County, West Virginia
Rivers of West Virginia
Tributaries of the Potomac River